Stephen James Metcalfe (born 9 January 1966) is a Conservative Party politician in the United Kingdom, who was first elected as the Member of Parliament (MP) for South Basildon and East Thurrock in 2010. He has served as the chairman of the Science and Technology Select Committee.

Early life and career
Before becoming an MP, Metcalfe worked in the family printing business. He stood unsuccessfully at the Conservative Parliamentary Candidate in Ilford South at the 2005 general election.

Metcalfe was an Epping Forest District councillor and a portfolio holder for Customer Services, ICT & E-government until he stood down in order to concentrate on his campaign to be elected as an MP. As a councillor he campaigned on issues including green belt protection and the introduction of traffic calming schemes as well as working with communities to find ways of engaging the young.

Parliamentary career
Metcalfe gained the seat at the general election in May 2010, defeating Labour's Third Sector and Social Exclusion  minister Angela Evans Smith.

In 2012, Metcalfe was named by Conservative Home as one of a minority of loyal Conservative backbench MPs not to have voted against the government in any significant rebellions. He was subsequently one of 136 Conservative MPs to oppose the third reading of the Coalition's Marriage (Same Sex Couples) Act 2013.

He has been a Vice-President of the House of Commons Debating Group.

Science and Technology in Parliament 
Metcalfe sat on the Science and Technology Select Committee from 2010 to 2019. He chaired the Select Committee from 2016-2017, before the chair was handed over to the Liberal Democrats. 

Stephen is currently the chair of the Parliamentary and Scientific Committee  (the All-Party Parliamentary Group for Science) under whose auspice Science in Parliament is published quarterly.  Stephen is also co-chair of the All-Party Parliamentary Group for Artificial Intelligence.  

Stephen is also a Director of the Community Interest Company (CIC) Big Bang Education. They organise the Big Bang Fair each year, an event to inspire young people into Science, technology, engineering, and mathematics (STEM).   

In 2017 Metcalfe was awarded for Services to Innovation from the Institute of Innovation & Knowledge Exchange.  

In 2018 Metcalfe was appointed as the Government Envoy for the Year of Engineering and attended events all over the country promoting diversity in engineering under the strap line ‘Engineering, take a closer look’. 

In 2019 Metcalfe was appointed as an Honorary STEM Ambassador.

In 2021 Metcalfe was elected as an Honorary Fellow of the Institute of Engineering and Technology in recognition of his outstanding contribution to the engineering profession.

Personal life
Metcalfe is married to Angela, with whom he has two children.

Metcalfe was educated at the Davenant Foundation School at Loughton, where he still lives.

Steven Metcalfe's secondary education from age 11-16 was at Loughton School (independent), in Loughton, Essex.

Awards
In November 2021 Metcalfe was awarded an Honorary Fellowship by the Institution of Engineering and Technology in recognition of his outstanding contribution to the engineering profession.

References

External links

1966 births
Living people
Conservative Party (UK) MPs for English constituencies
UK MPs 2010–2015
UK MPs 2015–2017
Politics of Thurrock
Councillors in Essex
UK MPs 2017–2019
UK MPs 2019–present